The R506 road is a regional road in the east of County Limerick, Ireland which runs west-east from its junction with the R445 regional road at Garraunykee, Annacotty and its junction with the R505 regional road in the townland of Dromsally on the outskirts of the village of Cappamore. En route it passes through the village of Murroe.

See also
Roads in Ireland
National primary road
National secondary road

References
Roads Act 1993 (Classification of Regional Roads) Order 2006 – Department of Transport

Regional roads in the Republic of Ireland
Roads in County Limerick